metigo is a software application that performs image-based modelling and close range photogrammetry. It produces rectified imagery plans, true ortho-projections on planar, cylindric and conic surfaces, 3D photorealistic models, measurements from photography and mappings on a photographic base for uses in the cultural heritage sector, mainly conservation.

Products
The metigo product line currently consists of

the mapping software metigo MAP,
the stereo-photogrammetry modeling software metigo 3D,
the free viewer metigo VIEW.
These products are all standalone and are not depending on other software, such as AutoCAD.

metigo MAP
metigo MAP is mainly used to map findings and conservation measured on a uniform metric photographic base. Therefore, photos of planar surfaces can be rectified based on geometrical informations, e.g. height and width of a rectangle, or cartesian coordinates measured by total station.

Beside rectified imagery several other metric mapping bases can be imported and used:
 true ortho-projections;
 scaled scans of plans and plots;
 CAD-files;
 3D models, such as digital surface models (DSM) produced by stereo-photogrammetry, SfM or 3D scanning.

 metigo MAP 's strong point is that rectified imagery taken with different techniques (visual light, sided light, IR, UV, UV-fluorescence, X-ray), historic images and photos taken at various stages of the conservation process can be superimposed and evaluated mutually.

The user can allocate several attributes, such as different conservation measures and damage classes, to the mapped geometries. The mappings can be analysed by geometries as well as by user-defined attributes at any stage of the project.

metigo MAP targets mainly conservators in different cultural heritage fields. Using it no specialist knowledge of surveying and photogrammetric techniques are needed.

metigo 3D
metigo 3D is a stereo-photogrammetric kit that allows to
 calculate bundle adjustments (axios3D),
 create high-quality 3D point clouds using multiple stereo photo pairs combined with metric survey data,
 mesh these point clouds,
 texture the meshes with high-resolution image data to create photo-realistic models,
 ortho-project orientated images on digital surface models (DSM) on planes and best-fit cylinders and cones,
 create unwrappings and developed views of curved surfaces,
 analyse deformations of 3D surfaces.

metigo 3D targets metric survey specialists working in the cultural heritage sector.

Supported file formats
metigo has the ability to read the following formats:
images: JPEG (.jpg), Tiff (.tif), Bitmaps (.bmp), CompuServ (.gif), Encapsualated Postscript (.eps), PCX (.pcx), Photo-CD (.pcd), PICT (.pcd), PNG (.png), Targa (.tga), RAW-format of several camera brands.
CAD: DBX, DXF, DWG.
3D: many ASCII-formats (.stl, *.wrl, etc.)
point data: format editor for ASCII files.

Supported languages
Currently, an English and German version of the software is supported. For metigo MAP beside these a French and Polish GUI is offered for sale.

Applications
The main applications of metigo are:
conservation in the cultural heritage context, e.g.
stone conservation
paintings
tapestry
etc.
architecture,
archaeology,
many other are possible, e.g. forensics.

History
The first public release of metigo was in 2000.

See also
Image rectification
Stereophotogrammetry
3D data acquisition and object reconstruction
Image-based modeling and rendering

References

Notes

 S. Bucher Fiuza, X. Castillio Della Valle, G. Siedler, Digital mapping documentation in the famous Munich's Ludwig Church with the software metigo MAP. - Key note speech at the "1st International Congress of Cultural Heritage and New Technologies - A contemporary Vision" in Mexico City.
 Matthias Hemmleb, Gunnar Siedler, Gisbert Sacher, Digitale Bildentzerrungen und -abwicklungen für die Anwendung in Denkmalpflege, Bauforschung und Restaurierung. 	
Von Handaufmaß bis High Tech, Interdisziplinäres Kolloquium, TU Cottbus, 23.-26. Februar 2000, pp. 74–82.

 Matthias Hemmleb, Gunnar Siedler, Gisbert Sacher, Documentation of the Basilica of Maxentius in Rome - methods for providing foundations for monument research. - XVIII CIPA Symposium - Potsdam, Germany - 18–21 September 2001 Proceedings.
 Sebastian Vetter, Gunnar Siedler, Automated 3D-object documentation on the base of an image set. - Paper presented at XXIII CIPA Symposium - Prague, Czech Republic - 12/16 September 2011 Proceedings.

External links
 Official web page of metigo MAP.
 Official web page of metigo 3D.

Graphics software